Gonopanope is a genus of crabs in the family Xanthidae, containing the following species:

 Gonopanope angusta (Lockington, 1877)
 Gonopanope areolata (Rathbun, 1898)
 Gonopanope nitida (Rathbun, 1898)

References

Xanthoidea